Spring Mountain is an unincorporated community in Monroe Township, Coshocton County, Ohio, United States.

History
Spring Mountain was laid out in 1836. The town was previously known as Ridge. Another early variant name was Van Buren. A post office was established under the name Ridge in 1850, the name was changed to Spring Mountain 1858, and the post office closed in 1919.

References

Populated places in Coshocton County, Ohio